The Cutty Sark Men's Fashion Awards were awards given for men's fashion design from 1979 to 1989. 

Each year, a rotating committee of around 50 members of the fashion press met to determine three nominees in each category and was then voted by the nation's fashion press. The award itself was a sterling silver trophy in the shape of a clipper ship, the emblem of the Scotch whisky marketed by Cutty Sark.

See also

 List of fashion awards

References

Awards established in 1979
1989 disestablishments
Fashion awards